Julius Zittel (October 2, 1869 - May 7, 1939) was an architect in Washington State. He was a draftsman at Herman Preusse firm and then became a partner at their firm. He became Washington's state architect.

Works
Selected works include:
Washington School for the Blind (1911), 2214 E. 13th St., Vancouver, WA (Zittel, Julius), NRHP-listed
Carnegie Library (1914)
Benewah County Courthouse, College Ave. and Seventh St., St. Maries, ID (Zittel,Julius), NRHP-listed
Bump Block--Bellevue House--Hawthorne Hotel, S 206 Post St., Spokane, WA (Preusse & Zittel), NRHP-listed
Dawson Brothers Plant, 517-519 N. Halsted St., Chicago, IL (Zittel,Julius), NRHP-listed
Edwin H. Hanford House, N of WA 217, Oakesdale, WA (Pruesse & Zittel), NRHP-listed
Holy Names Academy Building, 1216 N. Superior St., Spokane, WA (Preusse & Zittel), NRHP-listed
Mount Saint Michael, 8500 N. Saint Michael Rd., Spokane, WA (Zittel, Julius), NRHP-listed
Ritzville Carnegie Library, 302 W. Main St., Ritzville, WA (Preusse & Zittel), NRHP-listed
Spokane City Hall Building, N. 221 Wall St. and W. 711 Spokane Falls Blvd., Spokane, WA (Zittel,Julius A.), NRHP-listed
Spokane Public Library - Heath Branch, 525 Mission St., Spokane, WA (Zittel,Julius), NRHP-listed
Spokane Public Library - Main, 10 S. Cedar, Spokane, WA (Preusse & Zittel), NRHP-listed
St. Boniface Church, Convent and Rectory, 206 St. Boniface St., Uniontown, WA (Zittel, Julius), NRHP-listed
Washington State Normal School at Cheney Historic District, jct. of Fifth and C Sts., Cheney, WA (Zittel,Julius A.), NRHP-listed 
The cornerstone commemorating the exhibition hall (Horticultural Building) from the 1895 State Fair credits Zittel as its architect but other scholarship siggests Yakima architect William de Veaux was responsible

References

1869 births
1939 deaths
German emigrants to the United States
Architects from Karlsruhe
People from Spokane, Washington
20th-century American architects
Architects from Washington (state)